WLHH (104.9 The Surf - Hilton Head's Greatest Hits) is a classic hits radio station licensed to Ridgeland, South Carolina, with studios in Hilton Head and transmitter located between Ridgeland and Beaufort.

History
104.9 was assigned as a construction permit to Mattox-Guest Broadcasting with the WXRY-FM calls in 1985. The station signed on in 1988 as WZBZ, then to an oldies station in 1990 as WSHG, "Shag FM". In 1997, Shag FM moved its format to what was then WHBZ (now WXST) and became the original home of WGZR "The Gator", a country music station. In 2003, modern rock WWVV, at 106.9 FM, traded frequencies with the Gator.

Upon the station swap, WWVV ("Wave 104.9"), flipped formats and was a modern-based Adult Album Alternative station.  The station enjoyed a small yet loyal following in the Savannah, GA and Hilton Head Island, SC markets.  Ratings were usually higher in the Hilton Head market due to the limited signal over Savannah proper.

WWVV was owned and operated by Triad Broadcasting, known locally as Adventure Radio (the name of the company that owned WWVV before Triad), as Triad did not want to scare off potential advertisers and/or listeners by announcing new station owners. WWVV and six other stations were bought by Triad in May 2000. In the Savannah/Hilton Head area, Triad also owns stations Rock 106.1, BIG 98.3, Country 106.9, Y-107.9, and 1130 The Island.

On June 15, 2006, Triad purchased 103.1 The Drive from Zip Communications. Triad had been operating WGZO under a LMA with Zip. In order to comply with FCC regulations, Triad decided to sell their lowest-powered radio station, WWVV-FM, to South Carolina-based Broomfield Broadcasting via their subsidiary company, JB Broadcasting.

On November 21, 2006, the station began playing Christmas music as "104.9 John FM" with a new callsign, WWJN-FM. A male on-air voice could be heard in between songs stating "104.9 is John FM. John tells us what to play. Right now John wants to hear Christmas music so that's what we're playing. 104.9 John FM". JB Broadcasting sold the station to Low Country Radio LLC in January 2010 and signed off John FM on January 25. Until The Surf signed on on the 27th, the station stunted by broadcasting waves hitting the beach. JB Broadcasting resumed its online stream of John FM on February 1.

JB Broadcasting's sale of the station closed on March 15, 2010. The station changed its callsign to WLHH (We Love Hilton Head) on March 16, 2010, and shifted their format to classic hits.

The station was sold to Apex Broadcasting, Inc. for the purchase price of $682,500; the transaction was consummated on May 30, 2014.

In early 2017, Apex Broadcasting sold their radio stations in Charleston and Hilton Head. SC to Saga Communications for $23 million. The transaction was consummated on September 1, 2017.

References

External links

LHH
Radio stations established in 1988
1988 establishments in South Carolina
Classic hits radio stations in the United States